HPL may refer to:

Businesses 
 Haldia Petrochemicals Limited, an Indian petrochemical company
 Hutchison Property Limited, now Hutchison Whampoa Property, a property developer in Hong Kong
 Hindustan Prefab Limited, a project of the Indian Ministry of Housing and Urban Poverty Alleviation

Libraries 
 City of Hialeah Public Library, in Florida, United States
 Hamilton Public Library (Ontario), in Canada
 Hartford Public Library, in Connecticut, United States
 Hershey Public Library, in Pennsylvania, United States
 Houston Public Library, in Texas, United States

Other uses 
 HPL (programming language), for HP programmable calculators
 HPL Engine, a series of game engines
 HPL Engine 1
 HPL Engine 2
 HPL Engine 3
 Hartlepool railway station, England, station code
 Hermanos de Pistoleros Latinos, a Hispanic-American prison gang
 High-pressure laminate, a composite material
 Hockey Premier League, a proposed international league
 Human placental lactogen (hPL), a hormone
 High-performance low-power, a TSMC semiconductor wafer type
 HPL (benchmark), an implementation of the LINPACK computing benchmark
 H. P. Lovecraft (1890–1937), American author